Santosh Bangar is an Indian politician serving as a MLA in Maharashtra Legislative Assembly from Kalamnuri Vidhan Sabha constituency. He is a Shiv Sena politician from Hingoli district, Maharashtra.

In 2017 he was appointed Shiv Sena Hingoli district president and in 2019 he was elected to Maharashtra Legislative Assembly.

References

Shiv Sena politicians
Living people
Year of birth missing (living people)